Arthur Smith may refer to:

Politicians
Arthur Ryan Smith (1919–2008), Canadian politician, Member of Parliament for Calgary South
Arthur LeRoy Smith (1886–1951), Canadian politician, Member of Parliament for Calgary West
Arthur Smith (U.S. Representative) (1785–1853), U.S. Representative from Virginia
Arthur Smith (Australian politician) (1902–1981), member of the Victorian Legislative Council, 1958–1961
Arthur Smith (assemblyman) in 29th New York State Legislature
Arthur Smith (burgess 1685) on List of members of the Virginia House of Burgesses
Arthur Smith (burgess 1703) on List of members of the Virginia House of Burgesses
Arthur R. Smith (1805–1865), Virginia State Senate, Virginia Constitutional Convention of 1850, Secession Convention of 1861
Arthur Smith-Barry, 1st Baron Barrymore (1843–1925), Anglo-Irish Conservative politician
Arthur Leslie "Bud" Smith (1919–2002), Canadian politician

Sports
Arthur Smith (American football, early 1900s), American football player and coach in the early 1900s
Arthur Smith (American football, born 1982), American football player and coach
Arthur F. Smith, American college football coach
Arthur Smith (footballer, born 1887) (1887–?), English association footballer
Jack Smith (footballer, born 1911) (Arthur John Smith, 1911–1975), Welsh footballer and football manager
Arthur Smith (footballer, born 1915) (1915–2021), English association footballer
Arthur Smith (footballer, born 1879) (1879–1963), Australian rules footballer for South Melbourne
Arthur Smith (footballer, born 1908) (1908–1987), Australian rules footballer for Footscray and North Melbourne
Arthur Smith (Welsh footballer), Welsh footballer
Arthur Smith (amateur jockey) in National Hunt Chase Challenge Cup
Arthur Smith (cricketer, born 1851) (1851–1923), English cricketer for Sussex
Arthur Smith (cricketer, born 1853) (1853–1936), English cricketer for Middlesex
Arthur Smith (cricketer, born 1857) (1857–1937), English cricketer for Lancashire and Nottinghamshire
Arthur Smith (cricketer, born 1872) (1872–1952), English cricketer for Leicestershire
Arthur Smith (fencer) (1915–?), British Olympic fencer
Arthur Smith (golfer) in 1905 U.S. Open
Arthur Smith (rugby), English rugby union and rugby league footballer of the 1900s and 1910s
Arthur Smith (rugby league), English rugby league footballer of the 1920s for Warrington
Arthur Smith (rugby union) (1933–1975), Scottish rugby union footballer
Arthur Smith (sport shooter) (1887–1958), represented South Africa at the 1912 Summer Olympics
Arthur Smith (tennis) in 1930 Wimbledon Championships – Men's Singles

Musicians
Arthur "Guitar Boogie" Smith (1921–2014), American guitar player and composer
Fiddlin' Arthur Smith (1898–1971), old-time fiddler and songwriter
A. E. Smith (violin maker) (Arthur Edward Smith, 1880–1978), Australian violin maker

Writers
Arthur Smith (American poet), American poet
A. J. M. Smith (Arthur James Marshall Smith, 1902–1980), Canadian poet
Arthur Smith (comedian) (born 1954), British comedian and writer
Arthur D. Howden Smith, American historian and novelist

Others
Arthur Britton Smith, Canadian philanthropist and businessman
Arthur Smith (captain) (1680–1755), Founder of Smithfield, Virginia
Arthur Donaldson Smith (1866–1939), American explorer of Africa
Arthur Hall Smith (1929–2013), American painter
Arthur Henderson Smith (1845–1932), American missionary in China, author of books on Chinese culture
Arthur H. Smith (architect) (1869–?), English-American architect
Arthur Mumford Smith (1903–1968), judge of the U.S. Court of Customs and Patent Appeals
Arthur O. Smith, industrial magnate who founded the A.O. Smith Corporation
Arthur Smith (curator) (1860–1941), British museum curator and Director of the British School at Rome
Arthur Smith (illustrator) (1916–1991), British entomological illustrator
Arthur Smith (British Army officer) (1890–1977), commanding officer of British Forces in India and Pakistan, 1947–1948
Arthur Smith (historian) (1850–1924), British historian at the University of Oxford
Neddy Smith (Arthur Stanley Smith, 1944-2021), Australian criminal
Arthur Smith (priest) (1909–2001), Archdeacon of Lincoln
Arthur Smith (public servant) (1893–1971), Australian public servant
Arthur Smith (producer) (born 1960), Canadian-born American television producer
Arthur K. Smith (born 1937), American academic
Arthur Francis Smith (1849–1915), British organist and composer

See also
Art Smith (disambiguation)
Arthur Smyth (1707–1771), Archbishop of Dublin
Arthur Bowes Smyth (1750–1790), naval officer and surgeon
Arthur Smythe, List of Privy Counsellors of Ireland